The 2005–06 Serie A (known as the Serie A TIM for sponsorship reasons) was the 104th season of top-tier Italian football, the 74th in a round-robin tournament. The league commenced on 28 August 2005 and finished on 14 May 2006. While Juventus were originally the first-placed team, this title was put sub judice due to their involvement in the Calciopoli scandal, with Internazionale instead declared champions by the Italian Football Federation (FIGC) on 26 July 2006.

Rule changes 
Prior to the 2005–06 season, if two or more teams were tied in points for first place, for only one spot in a European tournament, or in the relegation zone, teams would play tie-breaking matches after the season was over to determine which team would be champion, or be awarded a European tournament spot, or be saved or relegated. However, 2005–06 saw the introduction of new rules. If two or more teams ended the season with the same number of points, the ordering was determined by their head-to-head records. If two or more teams had the same total points and head-to-head records, goal difference became the decisive factor.

Personnels and sponsoring 

(*) Promoted from Serie B.

League table

Results

Top goalscorers 
The Capocannoniere (top scorer) of 2005–06 was Luca Toni of Fiorentina. His 31 goals was the highest tally since Antonio Valentín Angelillo scored 33 for Internazionale in 1958–59.

Number of teams by region

Transfer 
 Summer Transfer
 Winter Transfer
 co-ownership
 co-ownership

See also 
 2005–06 Serie B
 2005–06 Coppa Italia

References

External links 

  – All results on RSSSF Website.
 2005/2006 Serie A Squads – (www.footballsquads.com)
 2005-2006 Serie A Final Season, Team, and Player Statistics in .PDF format - (www.worldcupadvice.com)

Serie A seasons
Italy
1